The mass media in South Sudan is underdeveloped compared to many other countries, including fellow East African states like Kenya, Tanzania, and Uganda. Poor transportation infrastructure and entrenched poverty in the country inhibit both the circulation of newspapers, particularly in states located far from the capital of Juba, and the ability of media outlets to maintain regular coverage of the entire country.

South Sudan nonetheless has several indigenous media outlets and a host of active journalists.

Media freedom
Following the Comprehensive Peace Agreement in 2005, the constitution of the newly autonomous South Sudan guarantees press freedom and ensures that all levels of government uphold the principle. Three progressive media bills were introduced in 2007 but were not enacted until the end of 2011, leaving journalists in that period without comprehensive legal protections and the media sector without a regulatory framework.

According to former Information Minister  Dr.Barnaba Marial Benjamin, the South Sudanese government guarantees freedom of the press, a significant difference from the neighboring Republic of the Sudan from which the South gained independence in July 2011. However, journalists including the editors of both The Citizen and The Juba Post have alleged harassment, abuse, and de facto censorship at the hands of the Sudan People's Liberation Army/Movement as recently as in the months leading up to independence, and the government has been known to confiscate newspapers and threaten radio stations with closure. The distribution of Arabic-language publications in South Sudan has also allegedly been restricted and outright banned at turns.Days after South Sudan gained independence, the Sudanese government banned the transportation of newspapers between the two countries and shut down publications and news bureaus owned by South Sudanese in the North, including the Khartoum bureau of The Juba Post.

South Sudan was ranked 124th in the Reporters Without Borders Press Freedom Index in 2013, falling by twelve places since 2012. Reporters Without Borders cited the murder of Isaiah Diing Abraham Chan Awuol, who was shot dead by an unidentified man on December 12, 2012 as the reason for the country's fall in ranking.

In 2014, Human Rights Watch and Amnesty International released a joint report about media freedom in South Sudan. The report, titled "The Price of Silence: Freedom of Expression Under Attack in South Sudan," accuses the National Security Service of harassing and detaining journalists.

Radio
Radios in South Sudan
Radio is the main source of news and information in South Sudan. Since the Comprehensive Peace Agreement of 2005, over 30 FM radio stations have been set up across the country with the encouragement of the Sudan People’s Liberation Movement (SPLM) run government. Radio networks and stations are run and funded by Churches, community organizations, international NGOs and private businesses.

Television
See Also: Television in South Sudan
The government-run South Sudan Broadcasting Corporation Television (SSBC TV) is based in Juba. It is the only functioning television station in the country. The SSBC TV broadcasts 15 hours a day in English and Arabic and can also be viewed on Satellite. The station runs a few small local TV stations in Aweil, Wau, Malakal and Rumbek. South Africa provides training for SSBC TV staff.

In 2013, the owners of The Citizen daily newspaper launched The Citizen Television (CTV) station broadcasting from the capital, Juba, for five hours each evening. However, in September 2015 the Editor-in-Chief of The Citizen Nhial Bol announced he was resigning and shutting down the newspaper and TV station after government security agents shut down his newspaper's premises, while receiving death threats.

News publications and outlets
Newspapers in South Sudan circulate almost exclusively among the educated elite in urban areas and very few copies reach rural villages. Nearly all newspapers are published in English and as of early 2012, most, such as the Southern Eye, were printed in Kampala or Nairobi and flown into Juba for delivery. South Sudan has two printing presses capable of printing newspapers, one is owned by the government and the other is owned by the daily newspaper The Citizen.

The Citizen and the Juba Monitor, both of which are produced and printed in Juba, are the country’s only daily newspapers.  The Citizen was initially founded by a former journalist of the Khartoum Monitor in Sudan and became South Sudan’s first daily newspaper when it transferred all of its operations from Khartoum to Juba. The Juba Monitor was launched in 2011 and is owned by a former BBC correspondent in Khartoum.

The bi-weekly Juba Post is edited by a team of journalists in Juba but is printed in Khartoum. It is the only South Sudan newspaper that is still widely sold in Khartoum. The Sudan Mirror is another bi-weekly newspaper that is produced and printed in Nairobi. 
Al-Maseer newspaper was the first Arabic-language newspaper to be published in South Sudan and was launched in February 2011. This newspaper was aimed at South Sudanese returning from Khartoum and proved to be very popular with the Arabic-speaking South Sudanese. Following disagreement over share distribution, this first Arabic-language daily ceased publication on Tuesday 10 June 2014. Most of the editorial staff then came together to launch a new Arabic-language daily, Al-Maugif, with its first issue hitting the stands on Saturday 14 June 2014.

SHE South Sudan magazine was an independent magazine providing information and entertainment to the women of South Sudan.

Several South Sudanese-led news organisations cover South Sudan from abroad. These include Radio Tamazuj, Sudans Post, South Sudan News Agency, and Sudan Tribune. 

Some other newly created online media outlets includes Talk of Juba, Hot in Juba, Nyamilepedia Press, and The South Sudan Friendship Press. Many of these upcoming media are also operated outside the country.

List of Media Outlets in South Sudan

The Press
 The Citizen - a private daily paper for the capital, Juba
 Juba Monitor - a government-owned daily paper for the capital, Juba 
 Sudan Mirror - a privately owned paper
 Al-Maugif - a privately owned paper

Television
 South Sudan Broadcasting Corporation Television (SSBC TV) – a government-run television station 
 Ebony TV - based in South Sudan
 Equator Broadcasting Corporation

Radio
 South Sudan Radio  - government-run radio station
 Radio Mirraya - UN owned station based in Juba
 Sudan Radio Service - a shortwave broadcaster based in Nairobi
 Radio Bakhita - own by Catholic Radio Network based in Juba
Advance Youth Radio - Juba based radio station run by a local NGO, Advance South Sudan
88.4 City FM - A commercial radio station run by Data Media in Juba
Radio Tamazuj - A shortwave radio broadcaster funded by Netherlands based Free Press Unlimited

News Agencies/Internet
 Sudan Tribune – an English-language news site based in France
Sudans Post – an English-language news site based in Juba, South Sudan.
 South Sudan News Agency - an English-language news site based in the United States
 New Sudan Vision - an English-language news site based in Canada
 South Sudan NEWS PORTAL - an online English-language news portal
Hot in Juba - an English-language news site based in Juba, South Sudan
South Sudan Friendship Press - an English-language news and opinion site based in Juba, South Sudan
Talk of Juba - an English-language news site based in Juba, South Sudan
Nyamilepedia – an English-language news site based in Vancouver, Canada.

See also
Television in South Sudan
Radios in South Sudan

References

External links
Sudan Tribune
Sudans Post
South Sudan News Agency
Talk of Juba
Hot in Juba
Nyamilepedia

 
South Sudan
South Sudan